The Ramón Sánchez Pizjuán Stadium is a football stadium in Seville, Spain. It is the home stadium of Sevilla Fútbol Club, and is named after the club's former president, Ramón Sánchez-Pizjuán (1900–1956).

It was the venue for the 1986 European Cup Final between Steaua București and Barcelona and the 1982 World Cup semi-final game between West Germany and France. It was also the venue for the 2022 Europa League final between Eintracht Frankfurt and Rangers.

With a capacity of 42,714 seats, Ramón Sánchez Pizjuán is the ninth-largest stadium in Spain and the third-largest in Andalusia.

Historical background

The President of Sevilla at the time, El Barón de Gracia Real, Juan Domínguez Osborne, had the responsibility to surround himself with a group of people who would help him succeed his future mandates. Within this group was Ramón Sánchez-Pizjuán himself and the effective Juan López García, who was presiding over the Seville club at a time when it had to overcome several important problems. Without a doubt, his main goal was achieved when he provided the club with land that would later be historic for the entity. Due to an urban imposition, Sevilla was forced to leave the ‘Campo de la Victoria’, after which the president, in an important management decision, acquired a plot of land from the land Nervión that was also owned by his friend Pablo Armero (Marqués del Nervión). Juan Domínguez, knowing that the club was not in economic conditions to assume said acquisition, did not hesitate to pay out of his po, the Baron indicated to his board secretary, Ramón Sánchez-Pizjuán, that once the matches were over, field staff, players, and coaching staff would be paid. Of the surplus, he took a certain percentage, leaving the same to reserve for unforeseen events that might have arisen. This way he reduced the debt, but slowly. When his term ended in 1932, Ramon Sanchez-Pizjuan felt that the payment strategy would not vary and that the amortisation of the payments for the land and stadium would not vary one iota. Juan Domínguez married Doña María Manjón and the Domínguez Manjón marriage was so heavily influenced by Sevilla that when the Baron died prematurely at the age of 53, they considered the debt that the Club still owed them forgiven, with the argument that her husband would have wanted it that way. Another one of the challenges for Barón de Gracia Real was to get his club to play in the First Division. Luck was elusive and despite the fact that each year the team gained new and important players, the long-awaited promotion did not arrive until a season later. In the first directive he had various companions that included Luis Ibarra, Eladio Rodríguez de la Borbolla, M. Amores, Luís Nieves, Juan Reimana, Eduardo Silvestre and Federico Maquedano who acted as treasurer.

During his time as president of Sevilla, he had numerous directors on his staff. Bernardo de los Ríos, Armando Soto el Illana, José Luís Isern Rivera, Nicolás Carretero, Joaquín García de Tejada, Manuel Gayan, José Luís Buiza, Federico Flores, José Manuel Puelles de los Santos, Ramón López Romero and mainly Ramón Sánchez-Pizjuán, the only one that missed the season 1928–1929, during a time in which the once great president of Seville held the position of President of the South Regional Federation. Eugenio Eizaguirre Pozzi, Francisco Toledo, Álvarez Rementería, Juan López García (Juanito Balompedico) Manuel Ríos Sarmiento, Carlos Piñar and Pickman, Antonio Calderón Hernández, Francisco Cárdenas, Antonio Alonso, Eduardo de la Matta, José Romero and even the incombustible Antonio Sánchez Ramos, the popular "uncle of the cigar". During his tenure, players such as: Guillermo Campanal, Ventolrá, Padrón, Deva, Abad, Adelantado, Arroyo, the Canarian Castro, Gual or the Huelva-born Bracero were signed. The Barón left a long descendant, almost all of them lived in the city and maintained a loyalty to the colours that their ancestors defended. A few years later his stepbrother D. Jerónimo Domínguez y Pérez de Vargas (Marqués de Contadero) also became president of Sevilla. After the death of Ramón Sánchez-Pizjuán, who purchased the currently-rented land for the future stadium in 1937, it was his successor Ramón de Carranza, who laid the first stone of the same on December 2, 1956, replacing  the ancient Nervión Stadium.

It was inaugurated on September 7, 1958, with a friendly match Sevilla – Jaén (3–3). However, it was not until 1974, when Eugenio Montes Cabeza was president, that the works were concluded, reaching its maximum historical capacity with more than 77,000 spectators. Ramón Sánchez Pizjuán was opened in 1958 as an all-stand stadium with a capacity of 70,329 spectators, replacing the Estadio de Nervión. Its capacity was reduced to 68,110 for the 1982 FIFA World Cup. It was further reduced to its current capacity of 42,714 seats when it was refurbished and transformed into an all-seater stadium during the mid-1990s.

The stadium is nicknamed "La Bombonera" (more commonly used to refer to Estadio Alberto J. Armando, the home stadium of Boca Juniors) or "La Bombonera de Nervión"  due to the Nervión neighbourhood where the stadium is situated.

This stadium contains a singular legend: the Spain national team has never lost a game against an international team in this stadium. In European competition, Sevilla has lost only seven times at home; to AZ Alkmaar in the 2006–07 UEFA Cup, to CSKA Moscow in the 2009–10 UEFA Champions League, to Real Betis in the 2013–14 UEFA Europa League, to Manchester City in the 2015–16 UEFA Champions League and to Bayern Munich in the 2017–18 UEFA Champions League, against Chelsea and Borussia Dortmund in the 2020–21 UEFA Champions League.

In May 2018, the club announced an expansion project for the stadium that will eventually increase its seating capacity up to 47,000.

1982 FIFA World Cup
The stadium was one of the venues of the 1982 FIFA World Cup, and held the following matches:

European Finals
The stadium has held the following finals in UEFA competitions:

Gallery

References

External links

The Stadium Guide
Virtual Tour.
Estadios de España 
Ramón Sánchez Pizjuán Virtual Tour at FootballStadiums360

Football venues in Seville
Sevilla FC
1982 FIFA World Cup stadiums
Buildings and structures in Seville
Sports venues completed in 1955
1955 establishments in Spain